Narayanpur Tatwara railway station is a railway station in Sawai Madhopur district, Rajasthan. Its code is NNW. It serves Narayanpur Tatwara. The station consists of 2 platforms. Passenger and Express trains halt here.

References

Railway stations in Sawai Madhopur district
Kota railway division